Raoul Kurvitz (real name Raoul Kurvits; born 3 February 1961) is an Estonian artist.

He was born in Tallinn. In 1984 he graduated from Estonian Academy of Art in architecture discipline.

Besides artistic activities he has also acted in films.

Personal exhibitions
Personal exhibitions:
 1991 Ormus I. Intermedia Centre Fylkingen, Stockholm
 1992 Infected. Gallery Okra, Vantaa, Finland
 1992 Myra Art Limited I. Vaal Gallery, Tallinn
 1992 Myra Art Limited II. Tallinn Art Hall's Gallery, Tallinn
 1992 Ormus II. Gallery Marius Project, Copenhagen
 1993 Ormus III. Luum Gallery, Tallinn
 1993 Sammas Gallery, Tallinn
 1996 Topographic. Rüütli Gallery, Tartu, Estonia
 1999 He and She. (with Ene-Liis Semper), Gallery Noass, Riga
 1999 Sümfoonia Si-bemoll. Tallinn Art Hall
 2000 About Love. Vaal Gallery, Tallinn
 2002 Impeerium. Rakvere Town Gallery, Rakvere
 2005 Viinistu Art Museum, Viinistu, Estonia
 2006 Tädi Klaara ja teised. Vaal Gallery, Tallinn

References

Living people
1961 births
Estonian Academy of Arts alumni
20th-century Estonian painters
21st-century Estonian painters
20th-century Estonian male artists
21st-century Estonian male artists
Artists from Tallinn